Serban Ghenea (born October 13, 1969) is a Romanian-Canadian audio engineer and mixer.

Early life and education
Ghenea was born in Bucharest, Romania, in 1969. In 1976 he moved to Montreal with his family. He later attended John Abbott College, Concordia University, then McGill University.

Career
Ghenea's career began through a chance meeting with Teddy Riley in 1993 while visiting his girlfriend (now wife), that lead to Riley hiring him as an in-house mixing and recording engineer. Throughout his career, Ghenea has worked with top artists in pop music, including Ariana Grande, Adele, Taylor Swift, Demi Lovato, Bruno Mars, Britney Spears, and Justin Timberlake. He has mixed over 188 #1 recordings. With Riley, Ghenea worked on projects that included Michael Jackson and Blackstreet.

Selected discography
 Tove Lo: Lady Wood, Queen of the Clouds, Disco Tits, Talking Body, Cool Girl
 The Weeknd: Blinding Lights
Lil Nas X: Montero (Call Me by Your Name), Sun Goes Down
Katy Perry: California Gurls, Teenage Dream, I Kissed a Girl, Hot n Cold, Waking Up in Vegas
 Kesha: Tik Tok, Blah Blah Blah, Your Love Is My Drug
 Destiny's Child: Emotion
 Jason Derulo: In My Head, Ridin' Solo
 Iyaz: Replay
 Björk: Crystalline, Cosmogony
 Jay Sean: Down
 Britney Spears: Outrageous, 3, Womanizer, Circus, Me Against the Music, I'm a Slave for You, Boys
 Miley Cyrus: Party in the U.S.A.
 Demi Lovato: Let It Go, Cool for the Summer, Confident, No Promises, Tell Me You Love Me, I'm Ready 
 Weezer: I'm Your Daddy
 Flo Rida: Right Round
 Glenn Lewis: Don't You Forget It
 BTS: Dynamite, Butter, Permission To Dance
 Blackpink: Ice Cream, Bet You Wanna
Little Mix: Shout Out To My Ex, Black Magic, Word Up!, Little Me, Heartbreak Anthem 
 Selena Gomez: Ice Cream, De Una Vez
 Lifehouse: Halfway Gone
 The Fray: You Found Me, Never Say Never
 Kelly Clarkson: My Life Would Suck Without You, Already Gone, Behind These Hazel Eyes, Because of You, Since U Been Gone
 A Fine Frenzy: Bomb In A Birdcage
 Toni Braxton: And I Love You
 Kelis: Good Stuff
 Garbage: Androgyny 02
 Little Boots: New In Town
 N.O.R.E: Head Bussa
 Matisse: Better Than Her
 Janet Jackson: Spending Time With You
 Air: Don't Be Light
 The Veronicas: 4ever
 Kevin Rudolf featuring Lil Wayne: Let It Rock
 Cobra Starship: Good Girls Go Bad, Hot Mess
 Pink: So What, Sober, Who Knew, 'Cuz I Can, Please Don't Leave Me, U + Ur Hand
 Avril Lavigne: Girlfriend
 Black Eyed Peas : My Humps
 Fergie featuring will.i.am: Fergalicious
 Carrie Underwood : Inside Your Heaven, Some Hearts
 Gym Class Heroes : Cupid's Chokehold
 Jewel : Intuition, Stand
 Justin Timberlake : Pose (featuring Snoop Dogg), Damn Girl (featuring will.i.am), Señorita, Like I Love You, Rock Your Body, I'm Lovin' It
 Ashley Tisdale : So Much for You, We'll Be Together, Guilty Pleasure
 Mark Ronson : Here Comes The Fuzz, Version
 N.E.R.D. : In Search Of..., Fly Or Die, Provider, Maybe, She Wants to Move
 Sugababes: About You Now
 Leona Lewis : Better in Time
 Musiq Soulchild : Love, Teachme
 Jill Scott : Who Is Jill Scott?: Words And Sounds Vol. 1, Beautifully Human: Words and Sounds Vol. 2, The Real Thing: Words and Sounds Vol. 3
 Dave Matthews Band : Stand Up, Dreamgirl, American Baby, Everybody Wake Up (Our Finest Hour Arrives)
 Robbie Williams : Rudebox, Lovelight
 Joe : Ride wit U
 The Hives : Tick Tick Boom
 The Virgins : Rich Girls
 We Are Scientists : Brain Thrust Mastery
 Carolina Liar : I'm Not Over
 R. Kelly : Double Up, Playa's Only, Slow Wind, Thoia Thoing, Snake
 Robert Randolph & The Family Band : Colorblind
 Usher : My Way, Here I Stand
 Kenna : Make Sure They See My Face, New Sacred Cow
 Michael Jackson : One More Chance, Hold My Hand (with Akon)
 BLACKstreet : No Diggity
 Faith Evans : Burnin' Up
 Mary J. Blige : Steal Away
 Syleena Johnson : Tonight I'm Gonna Let Go
 Marshmello & Halsey : Be Kind

Awards and nominations
Ghenea has won a total of 19 Grammy Awards and three Latin Grammy Awards.

He won the Grammy Award for Album of the Year four times; winning for Taylor Swift's 1989 and folklore, Adele's 25 and Bruno Mars' 24K Magic. Ghenea also won the Latin Grammy Award for Album of the Year for Shakira’s Fijación Oral, Vol. 1.

References

External links
Serban Ghenea at Discogs

Serban Ghenea at Variety

1969 births
Living people
American audio engineers
Grammy Award winners
Latin Grammy Award winners
Romanian audio engineers
People from Roman, Romania
Romanian expatriates in Canada
American people of Romanian descent
McGill University alumni
Juno Award for Recording Engineer of the Year winners